Pandora Clifford (born 13 December 1972) is an English actress who has appeared in various roles on stage and screen including Agatha Christie's Poirot, Wallander,  Taggart and New Tricks 

Born in 1972 in London, brought up near Edinburgh, she read classics at Bristol University before training at LAMDA. She wrote for the Art Sales Page of The Daily Telegraph. She is the daughter of Sir Timothy Clifford, former Director of the National Galleries of Scotland and Jane Clifford (née Paterson), previously the Principal Designer for Laura Ashley and Zoffany.

Family 
Pandora Jane Rosamund Clifford married Philip Mark Ivo Curwen (Ivo) in Scotland on 14 July 2001 but the marriage was void. A London marriage took place later that year.

Career 
Clifford played Lady Emily Palmerston in series 3 of the PBS/ITV series Victoria as the wife of Lord Henry Palmerston (Laurence Fox). She appeared on stage with Marcus Brigstocke in The Railway Children.

She has been seen on television as Vivienne Baxter in the BBC's New Tricks with Amanda Redman, Alun Armstrong, James Bolam and Anna Calder Marshall, and previously as Elizabeth Carlen in the BBC's Wallander with Kenneth Branagh, which won Best Drama BAFTA 2009; and on film as HRH The Duchess of Kent in Telstar, starring Kevin Spacey and Con O'Neill.

TV 
 New Tricks... Vivienne Baxter (dir Kenny Glenaan, BBC)
 Wallander... Elizabeth Carlen (dir Philip Martin, BBC)
 Taggart... Penny Forsyth (dir Ian Madden, SMG)
 Family Affairs... TV Reporter (dir Gill Wilkinson, Thames TV)
 Family... Jenny Macloed (dir David Drury, LWT)
 Chambers... Barrister (dir Gareth Carrivick, BBC)
 Agatha Christie's Poirot... Sheila Maitland (dir Tom Clegg)
 The Bill... Geraldine Hobart (dir Jo Johnson, Thames TV)
 Dunroamin'''... Horsewoman (dir Edi Stark & Moira Armstrong, BBC)
 The People are the Forest... Ensemble Cast (dir Douglas Hodge, BBC)
 Victoria, Lady Emily Palmerston
 Doctors, Prof. Tania van der Voort and Steph Ashdown
 Midsomer Murders... Juliet Tilman (dir Nick Laughland, Bentley Productions Ltd)

 Film 
 Telstar... HRH The Duchess of Kent (dir Nick Moran)
 2 Days, 9 Lives... Annabelle (dir Simon Monjack)
 Fortunes of War... Lead (dir Hamish Barber, Pop Video for Marillion)
 Sympathy with the Devil... Sandra (dir Rodney Griffiths)
 Superwoman... Emma (dir Rory Gilmartin)

 Stage includes 
 The Railway Children... Mother (dir Damian Cruden, Waterloo Station Theatre, London)
 Private Lives... Amanda (dir Nick Green, Oxford Shakespeare Company, Oxford)
 W for Banker... Louise (dir Ray Kilby, New End Theatre, Hampstead, London)
 The Ones That Flutter... Rachel Brooks (dir Abbey Wright, Theatre 503, London)
 Romeo and Juliet... Lady Capulet (dir Polly Findlay, Battersea Arts Centre, London)
 The Good Woman of Nohant... Solange (dir Chris McCullough, Royal National Theatre rehearsed reading)
 Noises Off... Brooke Ashton (dir Jeremy Sams, Comedy Theatre, West End, London)
 The Ecstatic Bible... 15 year-old Boy (dir Howard Barker, Adelaide Festival)
 Ride Down Mt Morgan... Bessie (dir David Taylor, Derby Playhouse)
 Frankenstein... Elizabeth (dir Damien Cruden, York Theatre Royal)
 Look Back in Anger... Alison (David Lightbody, tour of Scotland, Stray Theatre Company)

 Radio 
 Separate Tables... Jean Stratton (BBC Radio 4)
 Britannia's Wives''... 1930's Diplomat's Wife (BBC Radio 4)

References

Living people
British television actresses
Alumni of the London Academy of Music and Dramatic Art
Alumni of the University of Bristol
1972 births